DeMaio is a surname. Notable people with the surname include:

Carl DeMaio (born 1974), American politician
Joey DeMaio (born 1954), American bass player and songwriter 
Tom DeMaio, American football coach